Slavery was common in the early Roman Empire and Classical Greece. It was legal in the Byzantine Empire but it was transformed significantly from the 4th century onward as slavery came to play a diminished role in the economy. Laws gradually diminished the power of slaveholders and improved the rights of slaves by restricting a master’s right to abuse, prostitute, expose, and murder slaves. Slavery became rare after the first half of 7th century. From 11th century, semi-feudal relations largely replaced slavery. Under the influence of Christianity, views of slavery shifted: by the 10th century slaves were viewed as potential citizens (the slave as a subject), rather than property or chattel (the slave as an object). Slavery was also seen as "an evil contrary to nature, created by man's selfishness", although it remained legal.

Sources of slaves

A main source of slaves were prisoners of war, of which there was a great profit to be made. The Synopsis of Histories mentions that after the Battle of Adrassos many prisoners of war were sent to Constantinople. They were so numerous that they filled all the mansions and rural regions. Most of the domestic servants in large Byzantine homes were slaves and were very numerous. Danielis of Patras, a wealthy widow in the 9th century, gave a gift of 3,000 slaves to Emperor Basil I. The eunuch Basil Lekapenos, Parakoimomenos during the reign of Basil II, was said to have owned 3,000 slaves and retainers. Some slaves worked the landed estates of their masters, which declined in later ages.

A medieval Arab historian estimates that 200,000 women and children were taken as slaves after the Byzantine reconquest of Crete from the Muslims. Yet parents, living in the Byzantine Empire, were forced to sell their children to pay their debts, which Byzantine laws unsuccessfully tried to prevent. After the 10th century the major source of slaves were often Slavs and Bulgars, which resulted from campaigns in the Balkans and lands north of the Black Sea. At the eastern shore of the Adriatic many Slav slaves were exported to other parts of Europe.  Slaves were one of the main articles that Russian (often Vikings) traders dealt in their yearly visit to Constantinople. The old Greek word "δοῦλος" (doulos) obtained a synonym in "σκλάβος" (sklavos), perhaps derived from the same root as "Slav".

Social life
Slavery was mostly an urban phenomenon with most of the slaves working in households.  The "Farmers Law" of the 7th/8th centuries and the 10th century "Book of the Prefect" deals with slavery. Slaves were not allowed to marry until it was legalized by Emperor Alexios I Komnenos in 1095. However they did not gain freedom if they did. The children of slaves remained slaves even if the father was their master. Many of the slaves became drafted in the army.

The socio-economic status of slaves did not necessarily coincide with their legal status. Slaves of the rich had a higher standard of living than free persons who were poor. Also, the legal system made it advantageous for masters to place them in certain economic positions, such as foremen of shops. For example, a goldsmith accused for illicit trade of gold, if he was a slave, could be confiscated. If he was free, he would be whipped and pay a heavy penalty exceeding the value of a slave. Thus, masters were appointing slaves  as shop foremen, where they could have authority over free laborers (misthioi, μίσθιοι).

Eunuchs
Castration was outlawed, but the law was poorly enforced, and young boys were often castrated before or after puberty. Eunuchs (castrated boys and men) were traded as slaves, both imported to and exported from the empire. The scholar Kathryn Ringrose says they "represented a distinct gender category, one that was defined by dress, assumed sexual behavior, work, physical appearance, quality of voice, and for some eunuchs, personal affect."

Eunuch servants were popular at times. Rich Byzantine families often paid high prices for these slaves, who they sometimes accepted as part of the household. Eunuchs played an important role in the Byzantine palace and court where they could rise to high posts.

Prices
Slave markets were present in many Byzantine cities and towns. The slave market of Constantinople was found in the valley of the Lamentations. At certain times a 10-year-old child's price was 10 nomismata, a castrated one of the same age was worth 30. An adult male 20 and an adult eunuch 50 nomismata.

Transition from slave labour to free
Yet it is probable that ordinary labour in towns was conducted on a system like that introduced by Diocletian, whereby the labourer was bound to pursue a hereditary calling, but received wages and provided his own keep. This is the system indicated in the tenth-century "Book of the Prefect". The "Farmer's Law" of the seventh and eighth centuries shows the free "colonus" working in his village, and the slave working on the large landed proprietor's estate, but both classes tended to fall into the condition of serfs tied to the soil. Thus the Byzantine Empire marks an important transitional period from slavery to free labour. Emperor Justinian I (r. 527-565) undertook a major revision and codification of ancient Roman law, including law on slavery. He acknowledged that slavery was an unnatural state of human existence and not a feature of natural law. The Justinian law retained the principle that a slave was an item of property, but it did not state that a slave was devoid of personality. He removed some earlier harsh slave laws. For example, he gave to the slaves the right to plead directly and personally for their freedom, and he declared that the master killing his slave commits a murder.

Famous slaves
 Samonas (eunuch)
 Andrew of Constantinople (holy man)
 Tzachas (soldier)
 John Axouch (soldier)

See also
History of slavery
Slavery in ancient Rome
Arab–Byzantine prisoner exchanges

References

Byzantine